Kingdom of Oblivion is a studio album by Norwegian rock band Motorpsycho, released on April 16, 2021, through Stickman Records and Rune Grammofon. The album is available as a double vinyl, CD and digital download.

Track listing

Personnel
Motorpsycho
Bent Sæther - lead vocals, bass, guitar, keyboards, drums 
Hans Magnus Ryan - lead guitar, vocals, keyboards, mandolin, violin, bass
 Tomas Järmyr - drums, vocals

Additional musicians
Reine Fiske - guitar, keyboard

References

2021 albums
Motorpsycho albums